The Chismore Range is a small subrange of the Kitimat Ranges, located on the western edge of Porcher Island, British Columbia, Canada.

References
 
 Chismore Range in the Canadian Mountain Encyclopedia
 Natural Resources Canada
 mapcarta
 updated weather

Kitimat Ranges
North Coast of British Columbia